The 2005–06 Czech Cup was the thirteenth season of the annual football knock-out tournament of the Czech Republic. It began on 24 July 2005 with the preliminary round and concluded with the final on 19 May 2006. The competition offered a place in the first round of the 2006–07 UEFA Cup for the winner.

Teams

Preliminary round
The preliminary round took place on 24 July 2005.

|}

Notes: 1: match awarded to Admira/Slavoj.

Round 1
The first round was played on 31 July 2005.

|}

Round 2
The second round was played on 31 August 2005.

|}

Round 3
The third round was played on 21 September 2005.

|}

Round 4
The fourth round was played on 26 October 2005.

|}

Quarterfinals
The quarterfinals were played between 12 and 19 April 2006.

|}

Semifinals
The semifinals were played on 16 May 2006.

|}

Final

See also
 2005–06 Czech First League
 2005–06 Czech 2. Liga

References

External links
 Official site 
 Czech Republic Cup 2005/06 at RSSSF.com

2005–06
2005–06 domestic association football cups
Cup